The 1956 United States Senate election in North Carolina was held on November 6, 1956. Incumbent Democratic Senator Sam Ervin was re-elected to a second term in office over Republican farmer and businessman Joel Johnson.

Democratic primary

Candidates
Sam Ervin, incumbent Senator since 1954
Marshall C. Kurfees, Mayor of Winston Salem

Results

General election

Results

Footnotes

1956
North C
1956 North Carolina elections